The Silgar beach is a Galician beach located on the urban coastline of the municipality of Sanxenxo in the province of Pontevedra, Spain. It is 750 metres long  and is bordered from end to end by the eponymous promenade.

Description 
The Silgar beach is an urban beach  located in the ria of Pontevedra. It is separated from Baltar beach, in the civil parish of Portonovo, by a promontory known as Punta do Vicaño. At its right end is the large marina of Sanxenxo.

Silgar is the most touristic beach in Galicia. On this beach, on a rock a few metres from the coast, is the statue of Madama, the work of the artist Alfonso Vilar Lamelas.

Access 
The beach is located in the centre of Sanxenxo, surrounded by a promenade.

Gallery

References

See also

Related articles 
 Sanxenxo
 Ria de Pontevedra
 Rias Baixas
 Areas Beach
 Montalvo Beach
 La Lanzada Beach

External links 
 Photo: Night view of La Madame on Silgar beach, Sanxenxo
 Photo: Promenade, night view, Silgar Beach

Tourism in Galicia (Spain)
Province of Pontevedra
Beaches of Spain
Pontevedra
Beaches of Galicia (Spain)
Tourist attractions in Galicia (Spain)